A Man And His Music: Poeta del Pueblo (A Man And His Music: People's Poet) also known as Poeta del Pueblo is the fourth compilation album by Rubén Blades released on March 11, 2008. Being together with his album Anthology released on March 27, 2012 similar compilations only that this compilation has more successes in his career in Fania, the album contains songs by Blades in his stay at Fania from 1974 (with Willie Colón and Ray Barreto) until 1988 with the album With Strings featuring songs like El Cantante, Tiburón, Ligia Elena and Pedro Navaja.

Background 
After releasing Mundo on September 17, 2002, Fania released the Greatest Hits and Anthology compilation album series, Fania released the A Man And His Music series with their versions of A Band And His Music, along with Craft Recordings and Concord Music. Music with A Woman And His Music. compiling songs like Te Están Buscando with Willie Colón, Paula C, Plástico among others. Also included are the albums The Last Fight, Canciones del Solar de los Aburridos, Metiendo Mano! and Siembra also containing songs with the Fania All Stars such as the aforementioned Paula C which was originally recorded with Louie Ramírez (appearing on the album Louie Ramírez Y Sus Amigos) Juan Pachanga appearing on his album Rhythm Machine and "La Palabra Adiós" on his album Commitment.

Tracklisting

Disc 1 
All songs have been adapted from AllMusic.

Disc 2 
All the songs on Disc 2 have been adapted from Discogs and AllMusic.
Note: "El Cantante" was simplified "Cantante".

References 

Rubén Blades albums
Fania Records albums
2008 compilation albums